Göran Enckelman (born 14 June 1948) is a Finnish former footballer. He played in both Finland and Sweden, and for the Finnish national side. He is the father of fellow goalkeeper Peter Enckelman. He won Finnish Footballer of the Year in 1975. At club level he played for Reipas, KuPS, TPS, Haka and Nyköpings BIS.

References

External links
 TPS player profile

1948 births
Living people
FC Haka players
Finland international footballers
Finnish expatriate sportspeople in Sweden
Finnish footballers
Finnish expatriate footballers
Association football goalkeepers
Sportspeople from Lahti
Swedish-speaking Finns
Turun Palloseura footballers
Mestaruussarja players